The Pope Avenue Historic District is a U.S. historic district (designated as such on December 7, 2001) located in Winter Haven, Florida. The district is bounded roughly by Avenue A Northwest, Pope Avenue Northwest, 6th and 7th Streets Northwest. It contains 29 historic buildings.

Gallery

References

External links
 Polk County listings at National Register of Historic Places

National Register of Historic Places in Polk County, Florida
Winter Haven, Florida
Historic districts on the National Register of Historic Places in Florida